Esther Chae is a Korean-American actress, published playwright, speaker and consultant for Korean entertainment and Hollywood. Chae has appeared in numerous television shows such as NCIS, Law and Order: Criminal Intent, The West Wing, The Shield, and ER. She has also performed on theater stages including Yale Repertory Theater, La MaMa Experimental Theatre Club, Mark Taper Forum/ Kirk Douglas Theater, East West Players, P.S. 122, and Harvard/American Repertory Theater. Chae was among the inaugural class of TED fellows in 2009. She wrote and performed in So The Arrow Flies, an 80-minute one-woman performance about a North Korean spy and the FBI agent that hunts her down. It touches on post-9/11 themes of terrorism, political ideology, national identity and mother-daughter relationships.

Early life and education
Chae is the daughter of Dr. Hi-kyung Chae and Mrs. Inja Chae. She was born in Eugene, Oregon, and at the age of five moved to Seoul, South Korea.

She graduated from Korea University with a B.A. in French Literature. Upon graduation, she returned to the United States. Chae earned her M.A. in Theater Studies at the University of Michigan and her M.F.A in Acting at the Yale School of Drama.

Career
Esther Chae has been covered by the New York Times, Los Angeles Times, and Hollywood Reporter. Her life in Hollywood was the subject of a Korean Broadcasting Station (KBS) documentary.

Esther's television roles include NCIS, Law and Order: Criminal Intent, The West Wing, 24, The Shield and numerous national commercials; her theatre credits include Yale Repertory Theater, La Mama, Mark Taper Forum / Kirk Douglas Theater and Harvard/A.R.T. She currently teaches Advanced Acting for TV and Film at Emerson College (LA).

As a consultant, she has worked extensively in the entertainment business for the past two decades on major hits such as World of Dance (NBC), Black Panther (Marvel), Lost (ABC) and other high-profile projects.

Esther is an inaugural TED Fellow and has presented her talks at TED, TEDx, Arts Council of Korea and numerous other conferences.

Her unique experience as a speaker, actor and teacher allows her to help others hone their public storytelling and presentation skills. As a speaker coach, she teaches students how to craft effective presentations for business at Yonsei University (Seoul), and has worked with companies such as Sephora, XPrize, Overseas Koreans Foundation and other prominent private clients.

Notable awards and recognition
In 2015, Chae was invited to speak at TEDxPHX where she presented "WIBLDD: What If Bruce Lee Didn't Die." This unique talk, combined with performance, highlights Asian American representation (and lack of) in the media and arts through an enlightening conversation with a 75-year-old Master Bruce Lee.

In 2014, Chae was nominated for the "Extraordinary Chambers" (Play), 'Outstanding  Dramatic Production,' and   'Outstanding  Ensemble' by San Diego Theater Critic Circle.

In 2010, Chae received the 2010 APA Heritage Trailblazer Award by New York governor David Paterson. That year, she also received the 2010 University of Michigan Emerging Artist Alumni Award & King/Chavez/Parks Visiting Professorship and Emerging Artist Award.

In 2009, she was one of the inaugural 2009 TED Fellows. At the conference she performed an excerpt from her solo performance So The Arrow Flies.

In 2008, Chae was invited to the University of Southern California's Network of Korean-American Leaders (NetKAL) Fellowship Program which promotes community leadership among successful second-generation Korean-Americans.

In 2007, Chae was awarded the Korean Wave (Hallryu) Asia Star Award which was nationally and internationally televised throughout South Korea, Philippines, China, and Japan.

So The Arrow Flies
SO THE ARROW FLIES, written and performed by Esther Chae, is a political thriller about an alleged North Korean spy and the FBI agent who interrogates her. In his introduction, David Henry Hwang calls the play a "dazzlingly ambitious play, which explores nothing less than the identity of our world today."  Written by award-winning actor Esther K. Chae, the solo performance play explores complex political and social issues including America's national security apparatus, global identity and gender roles through modern heroines.

The performance debuted at New York's Estrogenius Festival in 2007. Since then, it has been featured at TED conference, Ars Nova Theater (New York City), Cherry Lane Theater (New York City), World Women's Forum (Seoul, Korea), Edinburgh Fringe Festival (Scotland), October Nights Theater Festival (Imola, Italy), and educational institutions such as New York University, Wellesley College and City University of New York's Martin Segal Theater Center.

So the Arrow Flies (Book) Archived in Yale Library, Drama Collection in University of Washington's East Asian Library (2016)

Archived in Korea's National Assembly Library (2015)

Published by Dong-in Press, Korea (2015)

Published by No Passport Press (in English and Korean) (2014)

So the Arrow Flies (Stage Play) Library of Congress, Archive Collection (2012)

Credits

Filmography and TV

Theater

Voice Over and miscellaneous

Personal life
Chae is fluent in English and Korean, and knows some French and written Chinese. Chae is certified stage combatant, and is trained in Korean Drum and Mask dance. She summited Kilimanjaro (Tanzania, 5,895m) and trekked the Himalayan Mountains (India, 1400m) and Machu Picchu (Peru, 7,972m).

Awards and recognition
2014 "Extraordinary Chambers" (Play) Nominated for 'Outstanding Dramatic Production' & 'Outstanding Ensemble' by San Diego Theater Critic Circle
2010 Asian American Trailblazer Award
2010 University of Michigan Emerging Artist Alumni Award
2009 TED Fellow
2009 Tanee Artist Recognition Award
2009 Durfee ARC Grant
2009 Asian Women's Giving Circle Grant
2009 Santa Fe Art Institute Screenwriting Fellow
2008 University of Southern California, Center for Asia Pacific Leadership
2008 NetKAL Fellowship
2007 Korean Wave Asian Star Award at the Asia Model Festival Awards
2006 Vision Award by The National Association for Multi-Ethnicity in Communications ("Cinema AZN"/International Channel)
2005 Producers Guild of America Film Development Workshop Fellow
2005 AFTRA Best American Scene Award ("Micro Miniseries"/ABC)
2005 Golden Reel Award, Best Radio Play ("Hiroshima" with Tyne Daly and Ruby Dee)
2001 Ammy Award for Asian Americans, Best Documentary Nominee ("Becoming an Actress in NYC")
2000 Obie Theater Award Nominee ("Pojagi"/Ping Chong and Co.)

References

Year of birth missing (living people)
Living people
Korea University alumni
New York Film Academy
University of Michigan School of Music, Theatre & Dance alumni
Yale School of Drama alumni
21st-century American actresses
American actresses of Korean descent
American television actresses
American stage actresses
Actresses from Eugene, Oregon